Keraudren Island is an island off the coast of the Kimberley region of Western Australia in the Indian Ocean.

The island is surrounded by Hedley Island to the West and Whitley island to the East.

It was named after Pierre François Keraudren.

References 

Islands of the Kimberley (Western Australia)